Khrystyna is a Ukrainian feminine given name. Notable people with the name include:

 Khrystyna Alchevska, Ukrainian teacher and a prominent activist for national education in Imperial Russia.
 Khrystyna Antoniichuk, former professional tennis player from Ukraine.
 Khrystyna Dmytrenko, Ukrainian biathlete.
 Khrystyna Kots-Hotlib, Ukrainian singer and beauty pageant.
 Khrystyna Pohranychna, Ukrainian individual rhythmic gymnast.
 Khrystyna Soloviy, Ukrainian-Lemko folk singer.
 Khrystyna Stoloka, Ukrainian model and beauty pageant.
 Khrystyna Stuy, Ukrainian sprint athlete.
 Khrystyna Yaroshenko, Ukrainian film producer, editor, and director in New York City.

Feminine given names